Alm and ALM most commonly refer to:
 Alms, i.e. donations.
 Alm (surname), a Swedish surname
 Alm (pasture), a managed Alpine grazing or hay-producing area
 All Lives Matter, a slogan associated with criticism of the Black Lives Matter movement
 Asset and liability management, the practice of managing financial risks

Alm or ALM may also refer to:

Businesses and organizations
 ALM (company), an American business news media company
 ALM Antillean Airlines, a defunct Curaçaoan airline
 Alm. Brand, a Danish financial services group
 Arab Liberation Movement, a former Syrian political party
 LIFE Church UK, a British Christian megachurch, previously known as Abundant Life Ministries
 Union Grand-Duc Adolphe, a music organization in Luxembourg, previously known as Allgemeiner Luxemburger Musikverein

Places
 Alm (river), a river in Upper Austria, Austria
 Alm, a stream in the municipality of Altena, North Brabant, Netherlands

Science and technology
 Almandine, a garnet mineral
 Additive layer manufacturing, a type of 3D-printing
 Application lifecycle management, the product lifecycle management of computer programs
 Arabic letter mark, a writing direction Unicode control character
 Article-level metrics, which measure the usage and impact of individual scholarly articles

Sports
 AG2R La Mondiale, a bicycle racing team, UCI code
 Bielefelder Alm, a stadium in Bielefeld, Germany
 A-League Men, a top-level professional football league in Australia

Transportation
 Arkansas, Louisiana and Mississippi Railroad, a shortline railroad owned by Genesee & Wyoming
 Alamein railway station, Melbourne, Victoria, Australia, station code ALM
 Alamogordo–White Sands Regional Airport, Alamogordo, New Mexico, US, IATA airport code ALM
 Alnmouth railway station, Northumberland, England, United Kingdom, station code ALM

Other uses
 ʾAlif Lām Mīm, the opening letters of six surahs of the Quran
 At-location mapping, a type of cartography
 Alm, one of the two protagonists of Fire Emblem Gaiden and its remake, Fire Emblem Echoes: Shadows of Valentia
 Artium Liberalium Magister, the Latin name for a Master of Arts in Liberal Studies

See also

 

 Alms (disambiguation)